David Mélé (born 22 October 1985) is a rugby union coach most recently for Leicester Tigers, he was previously a professional player for Perpignan in two spells, Leicester, Toulouse and Grenoble and represented  internationally. His primary position was scrum-half but also regularly featured at fly half.

Career
Born in Narbonne, France, Mélé started his career with Perpignan in 2006. He won the French Top 14 Championship with them in 2009.  In 2013 he joined Leicester Tigers in England's Premiership Rugby for two seasons before returning to France to play for Stade Toulousain.  In 2018 he returned to Perpignan for a second spell after also  playing for Grenoble.

He made his  debut on 10 March 2019 against Belgium, and went onto win four caps for Spain.

In July 2019 he rejoined Leicester Tigers as an academy coach who also helps train the club's half-backs.

References

External links

French rugby union players
Spanish rugby union players
Leicester Tigers players
Leicester Tigers coaches
USA Perpignan players
People from Narbonne
1985 births
Living people
Sportspeople from Aude
Spain international rugby union players
Stade Toulousain players
FC Grenoble players
Rugby union scrum-halves
French expatriate sportspeople in England
French expatriate rugby union players
French people of Spanish descent
Expatriate rugby union players in England